Wayne Township is one of the eighteen townships of Columbiana County, Ohio, United States. As of the 2010 census the population was 814.

Geography
Located in the southern part of the county, it borders the following townships:
Center Township - north
Elkrun Township - northeast corner
Madison Township - east
Washington Township - south
Franklin Township - west

No municipalities are located in Wayne Township.

Name and history

It is one of twenty Wayne Townships statewide.

The township was organized in 1806.

On July 26, 1863 Confederate Brig. Gen. John Hunt Morgan and his command surrendered to Federal forces on the Gavers-West Point Road one mile east of Prosperity Corners.
http://civilwardailygazette.com/2013/07/26/the-absurd-and-ridiculous-surrender-of-john-hunt-morgan/

Government
The township is governed by a three-member board of trustees, who are elected in November of odd-numbered years to a four-year term beginning on the following January 1. Two are elected in the year after the presidential election and one is elected in the year before it. There is also an elected township fiscal officer, who serves a four-year term beginning on April 1 of the year after the election, which is held in November of the year before the presidential election. Vacancies in the fiscal officership or on the board of trustees are filled by the remaining trustees.

Township Trustees
Jim May, Chairman
Edward J. Dailey, Vice Chairman
Nathaniel Pirogowicz

Fiscal Officer
Philadelphia D. Howells

References

External links
County website

Townships in Columbiana County, Ohio
Townships in Ohio
1806 establishments in Ohio